The Destroying Angel is a 1923 American silent comedy film directed by W.S. Van Dyke and starring Leah Baird, John Bowers and Noah Beery.

Cast
 Leah Baird as Mary Miller / Saraa Law
 John Bowers as Hugh Miller Whittaker
 Noah Beery as Curtis Drummond
 Ford Sterling as Max Weil
 Mitchell Lewis as 'Strangler' Olsen
 Philip Sleeman as Kidnapper

References

Bibliography
 Munden, Kenneth White. The American Film Institute Catalog of Motion Pictures Produced in the United States, Part 1. University of California Press, 1997.

External links
 

1923 films
1923 comedy films
1920s English-language films
American silent feature films
Silent American comedy films
American black-and-white films
Films directed by W. S. Van Dyke
Associated Exhibitors films
1920s American films